Enrique O. Gratas (born Gratás; November 25, 1944 – October 8, 2015) was an Argentinian journalist and television personality known for being the original host of Ocurrio Asi on Telemundo, and the former anchor of Univision's Última Hora (Last Hour), the second most popular Spanish newscast in the United States.

Biography
Born in Bahía Blanca, Gratas started working in Argentina as a radio speaker in 1966 and moved to television news a year later. He moved to the United States in 1971 and worked as a correspondent for the Argentine television.

Later he joined the sport division of the Los Angeles KWHY-TV station. In 1978 he conducted the first Spanish-language sports program from Los Angeles station KMEX-TV. From 1982 to 1985 he was the news director of the New Jersey WXTV.

In 1989, he moved to Miami where Executive Producer Fran Mires brought him in to anchor Telemundo's flagship show, the network's first daily investigative news magazine Ocurrio asi ("It happened like this"). When Gratas left Telemundo Network in 1999, Pedro Sevcec took over the show temporarily before being replaced by Ana Patricia Candiani the following year.

In October 2000, Gratas launched Última Hora on Univision, which successfully continued to be aired for 10 years. Gratas was laid off in March 2009 along with 300 other Univision employees.

Together with Jorge Ramos and  María Elena Salinas, they are considered amongst the most respected Spanish-language television journalists in the United States and Latin America.

Enrique Gratas last worked as the news anchor of Noticiero con Enrique Gratas on Estrella TV.

Health issues and death
Late in September 2015, Gratas recorded a video message where he declared to the public that he had an undisclosed disease. On October 8, 2015, Gratas died in Los Angeles at age 71. The cause of death was cancer, according to the Chicago Tribune.

Noted work
Among many others, Gratas interviewed:
George W. Bush, Donald Rumsfeld and Colin Powell
Jessica Lynch (first to interview her)
Yolanda Saldívar (the person convicted for the murder of famous Tejano singer Selena Quintanilla)

He has also covered a number of major events, such as:
Every American president since Richard Nixon
Events from Watergate to the 9-11 attacks in New York City
Numerous Democratic and Republican conventions
Anchored coverage of the new Millennium for the Univision Network
Both wars in Iraq
Luis Colosio's assassination (1994)
Olympic bombing in Atlanta  (1996)
2000 U.S. presidential elections
Several hurricanes
The political crises in Argentina and Venezuela

Recognitions
1996 Suncoast Regional Emmy Award
Premio Paoli (Puerto Rico), for his commitment to journalism
1998 Señor Internacional
Golden Globe nominee for best News Anchor
2005 City of Hope Cancer Center Award

See also
List of television reporters/Argentina
List of television presenters/Argentina

References

External links
 

Argentine journalists
Male journalists
Commentators
American television journalists
1944 births
2015 deaths
Argentine emigrants to the United States
American male journalists
Deaths from cancer in California